The 2022–23 Stanford Cardinal men's basketball team represented Stanford University during the 2022–23 NCAA Division I men's basketball season. The Cardinal, led by seventh-year head coach Jerod Haase, competed as a member of the Pac-12 Conference. They played home games at Maples Pavilion.

Previous season
The Cardinal started the 2021-22 campaign off on the right foot winning 12 of their first 18 games with an upset win over, at the time, #15 ranked USC Trojans. They would only win three of the final 12 conference games, finishing off the regular season at 15-15 with an 8–12 conference record finishing 9th in the Pac-12.

In the Pac-12 tournament, the Cardinal would face the Sun Devils in the 8/9 match-up. They would go on to beat the Sun Devils 71-70 on a James Keefe jumper in the paint as time expired. In the Quarterfinal round, the Cardinal would go on to face the number one seed Arizona, growing and holding a four point lead into the late second half, until Arizona pulled ahead with a little over three minutes left in the game and would never look back.

The Cardinal finished the 2021–22 season with an even 16–16 record.

Offseason

Departures

2022 recruiting class

Incoming transfers

In Stanford's season opener against Pacific, Jones became the first transfer to play for the Cardinal since the 2011–12 season.

2023 recruiting class

Roster

Schedule and results
Source:

|-
!colspan=12 style=| Regular season

|-
!colspan=12 style=| Pac-12 tournament

References

Stanford Cardinal men's basketball seasons
Stanford
Stanford
Stanford